The Upper Karoo Group is a sequence of Triassic to Early Jurassic sedimentary and volcanic rocks found in Botswana, Zambia, and Zimbabwe.

It comprises the Escarpment Grit (in the Mid-Zambezi and Limpopo basins) and the Angwa Sandstone (in the Mana Pools and Cabora Bassa Basins), overlain by the Pebbly Arkose Formation and the Forest Sandstone, capped by Batoka Formation basalts.

See also 
 Karoo Supergroup

References 

Geologic groups of Africa
Geologic formations of Botswana
Geologic formations of Zambia
Geologic formations of Zimbabwe
Jurassic System of Africa
Triassic System of Africa
Karoo Supergroup
Sandstone formations
Siltstone formations
Mudstone formations